Sebstian Olszar (born 16 December 1981) is a Polish former professional footballer who played as a forward.

Club career
Olszar signed for Premier League side Portsmouth in January 2004. He made one appearance for the club in an FA Cup tie against Liverpool at Anfield.

External links

External links
 

Living people
1981 births
People from Cieszyn
Sportspeople from Silesian Voivodeship
Polish footballers
Association football forwards
Poland under-21 international footballers
Podbeskidzie Bielsko-Biała players
Górnik Zabrze players
FC Admira Wacker Mödling players
Portsmouth F.C. players
Coventry City F.C. players
Polonia Warsaw players
Zagłębie Sosnowiec players
Piast Gliwice players
Ruch Chorzów players
Flota Świnoujście players
Bruk-Bet Termalica Nieciecza players
GKS Bełchatów players
Ekstraklasa players
Austrian Football Bundesliga players
English Football League players
I liga players
Polish expatriate footballers
Polish expatriate sportspeople in Austria
Expatriate footballers in Austria
Polish expatriate sportspeople in England
Expatriate footballers in England
Polish expatriate sportspeople in Germany
Expatriate footballers in Germany